This is about the  architect. For his father, see John Foster, Sr.

John Foster, Junior (1786 – 21 August 1846) was an English architect born and based in Liverpool. In succession to his father, he was Surveyor to the Corporation of Liverpool (1824–1835). His buildings were generally in the Greek Revival style and mainly worked on public buildings and Anglican churches.

Biography
John Foster Sr. married Ann Dutton on 18 September 1781 in the now demolished St George's Church, Liverpool (Derby Square, was built on its site). John Foster Jr. the second of eight sons born to the couple was born in 1786 in Liverpool. Foster studied under Jeffry Wyatt in Lower Brook Street, London, whose uncle James Wyatt had worked with John Sr. on Liverpool Town Hall. John Jr. displayed three designs at Royal Academy of Arts, in 1805 a design for a Mausoleum, in 1806 a design for a National Museum and in 1807 a Public Library or National Gallery. In 1809 travelled in the eastern Mediterranean. During 1810–11 he accompanied C. R. Cockerell and the German archaeologists Haller and Linckh in their excavation of the temples at Aegina and Bassae. He returned to Liverpool in 1816 and joined the family building firm. He succeeded his father, John Foster, Sr., as senior surveyor to the Corporation of Liverpool in 1824, and held that post until the Municipal Reform Act of 1834. His own designs included Holy Trinity Church in Kingswood, Bristol (1820),  The Oratory, St. John's Market, Liverpool Necropolis (converted into a park in 1914), St James Cemetery,  and the Church of St. Andrew's in Rodney Street, converted in the early 21st century to student accommodation. The second Royal Infirmary and the public baths have both been demolished, as has the enormous, domed Custom House, which suffered extensive fire damage during the Second World War. He is often attributed as the architect for numbers 2–10 Gambier Terrace, Liverpool.

Gallery of work

References

Bibliography

19th-century English architects
1786 births
1846 deaths
Architects from Liverpool